The Tendernob (or TenderNob) is an area in San Francisco, California between Nob Hill area to the north and the  Tenderloin to the south.  The name is a portmanteau of Tenderloin and Nob Hill, and is often used by realtors for marketing purposes.

The term is often used in local slang as a euphemism for the Upper Tenderloin and Lower Nob Hill areas. For instance, the San Francisco Chronicle includes the Tendernob as part of Nob Hill,  but the Michelin Guide does not differentiate between Nob Hill and the Tenderloin .

Academy of Art University owns and uses several buildings in this area for both housing and educational purposes.

References

External links 
  Refinery29 article about shopping in the TenderNob

Neighborhoods in San Francisco
Tenderloin, San Francisco